The effects of Hurricane Dennis in Florida included 14 deaths and $1.5 billion (2005 US$) in damage. The tropical wave that became Hurricane Dennis formed on June 29, 2005, and proceeded westward across the Atlantic Ocean. It became a tropical depression on July 4, a tropical storm on July 5, and a hurricane on July 7. Dennis rapidly intensified to attain Category 4 status on the Saffir-Simpson Hurricane Scale, and made landfall in Cuba where it weakened to Category 1 status, before re-emerging in the Gulf of Mexico and re–intensifying. The storm made landfall as a Category 3 hurricane on Santa Rosa Island on July 10.

In central Florida, Dennis produced numerous tornadoes, one severely damaging a house. In Punta Gorda, three people were found dead in a car submerged in a ditch flooded by heavy rain. Dennis made landfall in the Florida Panhandle, causing moderate damage, although not as severe as previously predicted. Storm surge of  inundated parts of St. Marks and nearby locations. During the height of the storm, approximately 236,000 customers in the Florida Panhandle were without electric power.

Preparations 

On July 7, a tropical storm watch was issued for Florida's Gulf coast from Bonita Beach southward, and for Florida's Atlantic coast from Golden Beach to Key Largo. Later that day, a hurricane watch was issued for the Florida Keys and Florida Bay. By 2100 UTC, the hurricane watch was upgraded to a hurricane warning for the Florida Keys. Subsequently, a tropical storm watch was issued for Florida's west coast north of Bonita Beach to Longboat Key which was discontinued at 2100 UTC. At the same time, a hurricane watch was issued for Steinhatchee River to the mouth of the Pearl River. By 0900 UTC on July 9, the hurricane watch was upgraded to a hurricane warning just prior to the discontinuing of the hurricane watch for the Florida Keys. At 2100 UTC on July 9, the tropical storm warning was lifted for Florida's coast from Golden Beach to Flamingo, and for the Florida Keys from the Seven Mile Bridge eastward. By July 10, all advisories for the Keys were discontinued and the hurricane warning was downgraded to a tropical storm warning for Florida's coast east of the
Ochlockonee River to the Steinhatchee River. By July 11, all advisories were discontinued.

About 50,000 tourists in the Keys were forced to evacuate by July 8. Governor Jeb Bush declared a statewide emergency, and evacuations started in the Florida Keys, a highly exposed chain of islands connected to the mainland by a single road and a series of bridges, stating that people "should have enough water, enough food, non-perishable food, batteries of course for 72 hours so that they could safely weather the storm". Residents of the Florida Keys who did not evacuate were advised to remain indoors due to dangerous weather conditions that were predicted.

At Cape Canaveral, the space shuttle Discovery was considered to be safe on its launching pad after concerns of unfavorable weather, and NASA rescheduled a liftoff the following week; however, shuttle managers eventually decided to begin moving Discovery from the launching pad to ride out the storm. In Miami, many high schools opened as evacuation centers, including Booker T. Washington High, Felix Varela High, Miami Northwestern High, Miami Sunset High, and South Miami High. Also, the MacDill Air Force Base in Tampa evacuated its aircraft to McConnell Air Force Base near Wichita.

In the Florida Panhandle, Governor Jeb Bush warned "This is serious. This is a very dangerous storm." As Bush announced that hundreds of tractor-trailers would be carrying ice, water and generators to staging areas in north central Florida, he stated "Here we go again", referring to the large number of storms which had threatened Florida in the years prior to Dennis. 700,000 people in the Florida panhandle were evacuated in the days prior to Dennis, 100,000 of them in Escambia County alone. The Red Cross put dozens of volunteers on standby to go into regions affected by the storm, and open shelters.
The Red Cross also moved 60 mobile canteens, each capable of serving 30,000 hot meals a day, to the staging points of Hattiesburg and Jackson.
National guardsmen were mobilized, and four emergency medical teams, each capable of setting up a small field hospital, were on standby. Also, at Eglin Air Force Base, about 20,000 military personnel were evacuated, and at Hurlburt Field, home to Air Force's 16th Special Operations Wing, a mandatory evacuation was ordered for all 15,000 airmen and their families.

Impact

South Florida and Florida Keys 

In southern Florida, damage was mostly limited to downed trees and minor flooding. In Miami-Dade County, gusty winds knocked out several traffic lights along U.S. 1, the only route to and from the Florida Keys. A man died in Ft. Lauderdale when he stepped on a downed electrical wire and was electrocuted. Also, 100,000 homes in Miami-Dade County were without electric power.

Damage in the Keys totaled $100,000 (2005 USD), mostly to landscape and electric utility equipment. During the height of the storm, 211,000 customers were without electric power in South Florida and the Keys, including the whole city of Key West.

 at 0800 UTC on July 9. These strong winds pushed a vintage DC-3 plane about 300 yards (1000 ft) down the tarmac at the Key West airport, which was closed during the storm. In addition,
a man drowned in a rip current off of Hollywood Beach.

One beneficial effect of Hurricane Dennis was the rolling of the former USS Spiegel Grove. Spiegel Grove was sunk in Florida Keys National Marine Sanctuary in an attempt to create an artificial reef. However, the ship turned over and landed on the bottom upside down. Efforts to roll the ship were partially successful, bringing it onto its starboard side, but Hurricane Dennis completed the roll, bringing Spiegel Grove into its intended upright position.

Central Florida 
Damage was mostly minor and limited to outer rainbands and tornadoes in Central Florida. In the Tampa Bay area, several tornadoes were reported to have touched down causing minor damage such as downed trees and power lines. On July 8, five tornadoes were officially reported, three of which caused damage. The most notable one left a path of damage one-half mile wide, severely damaging a house. On July 9, four tornadoes officially touched down, with the most notable one downing numerous trees and some power lines. In Punta Gorda, three people were found dead in a car submerged in a ditch flooded by heavy rain. The victims were still wearing their seat belts when found.

Florida Panhandle 

Hurricane Dennis made landfall as a Category 3 hurricane on Santa Rosa Island on July 10. At the Pensacola Airport, a minimum pressure reading of 956.3 mb was recorded and at Navarre, a pressure reading of 965.2 mb was seen. Additionally, an unofficial storm chaser reported a minimum pressure of 942 mb at Pace, Florida. The most severe property damage occurred from Walton County to Wakulla County, where 1,000 homes were destroyed. Numerous boats were ripped from the dock and either floated out to sea, or were washed ashore. In McDavid, the tin roof of the recreation center for Ray's Chapel was ripped off as about 12 people stood in the hallway.
Also, several historic sites were damaged or destroyed by Dennis; Angelo's on Ochlockonee Bay, a landmark restaurant, was completely washed away. Beach front cottages on St. Teresa were either damaged or destroyed and several beach dunes on St. George Island were washed away by the pounding surf. On Holiday Island, several houses and apartment buildings were severely damaged.

In Apalachee Bay, storm surge of  inundated parts of St. Marks and nearby locations, which was higher than previously anticipated and was thought to be enhanced by an oceanic trapped shelf wave that
propagated northward along Florida's west coast. As a result, sea water washed ashore up to eight blocks inland. The surge, in combination with the high surf, caused moderate beach erosion and wiped out 80 percent of the sea turtle's nests. Along the coast, severe beach erosion occurred as a result of the storm, mostly in Walton, Bay, Gulf, Franklin and Wakulla counties. As a result of the pounding surf, the Navarre pier was ripped apart in two places. Navarre Beach was one of the hardest-hit areas, with almost every structure receiving some type of damage.

Milton received  of rain, which is the highest reported rainfall total in Florida caused by Dennis. In southern Leon County, flooding was reported with several areas under  of water. At St. George Island,  of road and numerous buildings were damaged or destroyed. Parts of U.S. Route 98 were washed out by flood waters, cutting off the main route between Tallahassee and St. George Island; portions of I-10 in Pensacola were also flooded, causing major delays in supplies.

As a result of the storm, over 236,000 customers in the Florida Panhandle were without electric power. An indirect death occurred when a three-year-old boy was accidentally crushed to death when his father ran him over with a car as the family was evacuating. Two more people died from carbon monoxide poisoning in Escambia County. In all, two people were directly killed while several others were killed indirectly, and total damage amounted to $1.5 billion (2005 USD).

Aftermath 

In the aftermath of the hurricane, president George W. Bush declared 13 counties–Bay, Calhoun, Escambia, Franklin, Gulf, Holmes, Jackson, Monroe, Okaloosa, Santa Rosa, Wakulla, Walton and Washington– in Florida as federal disaster areas. Applicants, including units of local government, in 19 counties became eligible for Public Assistance funds for emergency services and debris removal and to help rebuild essential public facilities. On July 10, President Bush ordered the release of federal disaster funds and emergency resources for Florida to aid people effected by Dennis. One day after the storm made landfall, four disaster recovery centers were opened by disaster officials, two in Escambia County, and two in Santa Rosa County. Supplies of food, water and ice were supplied from staging areas to distribution centers throughout the Florida Panhandle. The American Red Cross and other voluntary agencies assisted with food and water distribution as well as emergency needs and housing. Subsequently, an additional disaster relief center was opened in Santa Rosa County. Just days after the storm, six additional counties became eligible for federal disaster aid.

Voluntary agencies such as AmeriCorps, the Christian Contractors Association and the United Way provided assistance to residents who have temporary roofing and repair needs. Shortly after, three additional disaster relief centers opened on July 16, with one being in Franklin County, one in Okaloosa County, and another in Wakulla County. Within a week, over 2,100 individuals visited the Disaster Recovery Centers in Escambia and Santa Rosa counties. Another disaster recovery center opened in Franklin County on July 7, and by July 18, over $3 million (2005 USD) in individual assistance applications for rental, housing and other needs assistance were approved. On July 23, Dixie and Levy counties became eligible
federal funds under its Public Assistance program for damages. By July 28, all disaster recovery centers ceased operations on Sundays, although on August 4, Gadsden County became eligible
for Public Assistance funding. Two more disaster recovery centers opened on August 4: one in Dixie County and one in Taylor County. By August 18, over $24 million (2005 USD) in individual assistance funds were collected for victims of Hurricane Dennis. On October 13, the last disaster recovery centers ceased operations, although individual assistance funds were still being collected.

See also 

 List of Florida hurricanes (2000-present)
 Effects of Hurricane Dennis in Alabama
 Effects of Hurricane Dennis in Georgia
 Effects of Hurricane Dennis in Mississippi

References

External links 

 
 Advisory archives
 Hurricane Dennis aftermath
 Palm Beach Post archive

Florida
Dennis
Dennis (2005)
2005 in Florida
Dennis Florida